The 2020–21 season was the 141st season of competitive football by Rangers.

Rangers played a total of 56 competitive matches during the 2020−21 season.

On 7 March 2021, Rangers clinched the Premiership title, their 55th Scottish championship, after rivals Celtic drew 0–0 away to Dundee United. It was Rangers' first league title in a decade and the first time Celtic had not finished as league champions in that same span.

With a 4–0 win over Aberdeen on the final day of the season, Rangers sealed an undefeated league season and became the first club since Celtic in 2016–17 to reach the 100 point milestone. Rangers won all 19 home games at Ibrox and equalled the league record of 26 clean sheets in the campaign. They also set a new British record by conceding only 13 goals in their 32 wins and six draws.

Players

Squad information

Transfers

In

First team

Academy

Out

First team

Academy

New contracts

First team

Academy

Awards

Results and fixtures

Pre-season and friendlies

Scottish Premiership

UEFA Europa League

Rangers qualified for the second qualifying round after finishing in second place in the 2019–20 Scottish Premiership.

Qualification stage

Group stage

Knockout stage

Round of 32

Round of 16

Scottish League Cup

Scottish Cup

Squad statistics
The table below includes all players registered with the SPFL as part of the Rangers squad for 2020–21 season. They may not have made an appearance.

Appearances, goals and discipline
{| class="wikitable sortable" style="text-align:center"
|-
!rowspan="2" style="background:#00f; color:white;" |No.
!rowspan="2" style="background:#00f; color:white;" |Pos.
!rowspan="2" style="background:#00f; color:white;" |Nat.
!rowspan="2" style="background:#00f; color:white;" |Name
!colspan="2" style="background:#00f; color:white;" |Totals
!colspan="2" style="background:#00f; color:white;" |Scottish Premiership
!colspan="2" style="background:#00f; color:white;" |Scottish Cup
!colspan="2" style="background:#00f; color:white;" |League Cup
!colspan="2" style="background:#00f; color:white;" |Europa League
!colspan="2" style="background:#00f; color:white;" |Discipline
|-
!Apps
!Goals
!Apps
!Goals
!Apps
!Goals
!Apps
!Goals
!Apps
!Goals
!
!
|-
! colspan=16 style=background:#dcdcdc; text-align:center| Goalkeepers
|-
||2||0
||0||0
||0||0
|-
! colspan=16 style=background:#dcdcdc; text-align:center| Defenders
|-
||3||0
||3||0
||3||0
||2||0
||5||0
||0||0
||0||0
||4||1
||8||0
||0||0
|-
! colspan=16 style=background:#dcdcdc; text-align:center| Midfielders
|-
||6||0
||1||0
||5||0
||3||0
||2||0
||3||0
||5||0
||2||0
|-
! colspan=16 style=background:#dcdcdc; text-align:center| Forwards
|-
||0||0
||2||0
||10||0
||1||0
||0||0
||3||1
|-
! colspan=16 style=background:#dcdcdc; text-align:center| Players transferred or loaned out during the season who made an appearance
||0||0
||1||0
||0||0
||0||0
|-
||0||0
|-
 Appearances (starts and substitute appearances) and goals include those in Scottish Premiership, League Cup, Scottish Cup, and the UEFA Europa League.

Clean sheets

Competitions

Overall

Scottish Premiership

Standings

Results by round

See also
 List of unbeaten football club seasons

References 

Rangers F.C. seasons
Rangers
Rangers
Scottish football championship-winning seasons